So Lucky is an album by guitarist Noël Akchoté featuring tracks composed, performed, or inspired by Kylie Minogue. The album was recorded in 2006 and released by Winter & Winter in 2007.

Reception

All About Jazz said "French guitarist Noël Akchoté has previously been associated with avant-leaning projects of heady conception and eclectic leanings, so his new recording, So Lucky, may surprise fans for its overtly commercial appeal. A collection of straightforward renditions of diatonic melodies and functional harmonies, emphasizing tunefulness over improvisative exploration, the album's appeal lies in its subtle variations on a theme, tasteful texturing and rubato moments".

Track listing
All compositions by Matt Aitken, Mike Stock and Pete Waterman except as indicated
 "Bittersweet Goodbye" (Steve Anderson, Kylie Minogue) - 4:19
 "Some Kind of Bliss" (James Dean Bradfield, Kylie Minogue, Sean Moore) - 3:23
 "My Secret Heart" - 2:21
 "Come into My World" (Rob Davis, Cathy Dennis) - 2:59
 "Red Blooded Woman" (Johnny Douglas, Karen Poole) - 2:54   
 "The Loco-Motion" (Gerry Goffin, Carole King) - 1:38
 "Can't Get You Out of My Head" (Rob Davis, Cathy Dennis) - 3:32
 "Giving You Up" (Nick Coler, Miranda Cooper, Lisa Cowling, Brian Higgins, Kylie Minogue, Tim Powell, Paul Woods) - 3:03
 "Confide in Me" (Steve Anderson, Dave Seaman, Owain Barton) - 3:22
 "Tears on My Pillow" (Sylvester Bradford, Al Lewis) - 2:21
 "Fragile" (Rob Davis) - 2:42
 "Slow" (Dan Carey, Kylie Minogue, Emiliana Torrini) - 3:20
 "Tell Tale Signs" - 2:50
 "I Should Be So Lucky" - 3:47
 "Wouldn't Change a Thing" - 1:51
 "Turn It into Love" - 2:58
 "Especially for You" - 3:38
 "Fever" (Greg Fitzgerald, Tom Nichols) - 3:19
 "I'll Still Be Loving You" - 2:27
 "The Crying Game" (Geoff Stephens) - 1:40

Personnel
Noël Akchoté - guitar

References

Winter & Winter Records albums
Noël Akchoté albums
2007 albums
Kylie Minogue